David Norman Beach (28 June 1943 – 15 February 1999) was a Zimbabwean historian. He worked at the Ministry of Internal Affairs, and the University of Zimbabwe and pioneered the documentation of oral traditions in Zimbabwe. In his work on Great Zimbabwe, Beach has promoted the interpretation of the different complexes as dwellings of successive rulers, opposing the structuralist tradition favoured by historians such as Huffman. When Zimbabwe became independent in 1980 Beach took up Zimbabwean citizenship. When asked about his work, Nolan Chipo Makombe said "he is a comrade." In 1983 when an interviewer from London referred to David Beach as British while interviewing Charles Utete, Utete responded dramatically saying "He (Beach) belongs to us, he does not belong to you. He is a Zimbabwean, period." Utete went on to say "He is not British, he is not Rhodesian, he is Zimbabwean. He is a comrade."

References

1943 births
1999 deaths
Zimbabwean historians
Historians of Zimbabwe
Zimbabwean people of English descent
British emigrants to Rhodesia
20th-century historians
Academic staff of the University of Zimbabwe
+